Chris Montgomery is an Australian former professional rugby league footballer who played in the 1970s and 1980s.  Montgomery was a foundation player for Illawarra playing in the club's first game.

Playing career
Montgomery made his first grade debut for Manly-Warringah in Round 17 1977 against Eastern Suburbs at the Sydney Cricket Ground.

In 1978, Montgomery made 6 appearances but was not a part of the premiership winning team which defeated Cronulla-Sutherland in the grand final replay.

In 1980, Montgomery joined arch rivals North Sydney and scored a try on debut for the club.  Montgomery returned to Manly in 1981 before departing the club once again.

In 1982, Montgomery joined newly admitted Illawarra and played in the club's first ever game which was against Penrith at WIN Stadium and ended in a 17–7 loss.  Montgomery made 10 appearances for Illawarra in their inaugural season but scored no tries.

Montgomery returned to Manly in 1983 for a third spell with them before retiring at the end of the season.

References

1958 births
Living people
Manly Warringah Sea Eagles players
Illawarra Steelers players
North Sydney Bears players
Australian rugby league players
Rugby league wingers
Rugby league fullbacks
Rugby league players from New South Wales